Ybyrai (Ibrahim) Altynsarin (Ybyrai Altynsarin; , 1841–1889) was a major figure in pre-Soviet Kazakh history. He was the most prominent Kazakh educator of the late 19th century, during the period of Russian colonization of and cultural influence in Kazakhstan.

Ibrahim Altynsarin was born in the Araqaraghai region of Turgay Oblast (now Kostanay Province) of modern-day Kazakhstan and in his early career he was an inspector of Torghai schools.  Like all ethnic Kazakhs, Ibrahim was raised in an Islamic family that valued tradition and religion over many other aspects
of life.  Due to the influx of Russian influence in the area, though, he developed more progressive views for Kazakh society to westernize and accelerate.  This allowed him to come up with multiple ways to modernize Kazakh society.

Ibrahim Altynsarin is best known for introducing the transition from the Perso-Arabic alphabet to the Cyrillic alphabet for the Kazakh language, and was a proponent of teaching in the Western style. Being a Muslim, though, he opposed the teaching of Orthodox Christian doctrines to non-Russian Kazakhs, but at the same time urged resistance to Tatar language and culture, in favor of Russian and Western influences. As an educator, he opened numerous Kazakh-Russian boarding schools, technical schools and schools for girls.

Altynsarin is also credited with authoring the first Kazakh grammar book, the first Kazakh-Russian newspaper, and with translation of a large number of textbooks and reference works. He was honored by the Imperial Russian government with numerous awards, including the title statski sovetnik (State Counsellor).

A number of Kazakh institutions, including the Kazakh Academy of Education, Arkalyk State Pedagogical Institute and some streets, schools, and academic awards, are named after Altynsarin. There is an Altynsarin museum in Kostanay.

Ybyrai grew up with his grandfather because of the early death of his father. He perfectly finished the school in Orynbor.

In his last years, he decides to move 3 kilometers away from Kostanay and builds a house there, near the river Tobyl. He works here until his death. He was buried near the river, near his father's coffin.

Childhood
When he was approximately 3 years old, his dad passed away. So he had no choice, but to be raised by his grandfather, Balgozha biy. His grandpa wanted his grandson to be competent and to become a bright person, so he was listed in school in Orynbor, a famous and improving city for his time. His grandfather would send him envelopes with news:
                                 Үміт еткен көзімнің нұры – балам,
                                 Жаныңа жәрдем берсін Хақ тағалам.
                                 Атаң мұнда анаңмен есен-аман,
                                 Сүйіп сәлем жазады бүгін саған.
                                 Атаңды сағындым деп асығарсың,
                                 Надан боп білмей қалсаң, аһ ұрарсың.
                                 Шырағым, мұнда жүрсең не етер едің,
                                 Қолыңа құрық алып кетер едің.
                                 Тентіреп екі ауылдың арасында
                                 Жүргенмен, не мұратқа жетер едің?!
                                 
                                  The light of my eyes, only hope is my child,
                                  May the Almighty help you.
                                  Your grandfather is safe here with your mother,
                                  Greetings to you today.
                                  You are in a hurry to miss your grandfather,
                                  If you are ignorant, you will sigh.
                                  My precious, what would you do if you were here,
                                  You would take a handkerchief.
                                  Wandering between the two villages
                                  What would you achieve if you're just dawdling?!

Mausoleum and Museum
A mausoleum and museum were constructed on the site of Altynsarin's final resting place in Kostanay, Kazakhstan.

Legacy 
On November 2, 2021, the country of Kazakhstan recognized the celebration of 190 years since the birth of the prominent Kazakh educated, Ybrai Altynsarin. 

On December 30, 2021, a monument was opened in honor of Altynsarin in Almaty.

His most popular works/compositions
 Начальное руководство к обучению киргизов русскому языку, Оренбург, 1879; 
 Қазақ хрестоматиясы, Орынбор, 1906; Мәктубат, Қазан, 1896, 1899; 
 Киргизская хрестоматия, Оренбург, 1879, 1906; 
 Таңд. шығ. 3 томдық, А., 1943, 1953; 
 Собрание сочинений в 3-х т. Т.1–3, А.-А., 1975, 1978; 
 Әңгімелер, А., 1980. 
 Өлеңдер 
 Азған елдің хандары 
 Балғожа бидің баласына жазған хаты 
 Жаз 
 Кел, балалар, оқылық 
 Қарлығаш 
 Қарға мен түлкі 
 Әй, достарым 
 Әй, жігіттер 
 Өзен 
 Өнер - білім бар жұрттар 
 Өсиет өлеңдер 
 Әңгімелер 
 Ізбасты 
 Айуанның естесі көп бірақ адамдай толық ақылы жоқ 
 Алтын -айдыр 
 Алтын шеттеуік 
 Асыл шөп 
 Ақымақ дос 
 Білгеннің пайдасы 
 Бір уыс мақта 
 Бай баласы мен жарлы баласы 
 Байұлы 
 Баланың айласы 
 Бақша ағаштары 
 Данышпан қазы 
 Дүние қалай етсең табылады 
 Жаман жолдас 
 Жамандыққа жақсылық 
 Жан-жануарлардың дауласқаны 
 Жиренше шешен 
 Жомарт 
 Жәнібек батыр 
 Зеректік 
 Киіз үй мен ағаш үй 
 Лұқпан әкім 
 Малды пайдаға жарату 
 Мейірімді бала 
 Мұжық пен жасауыл 
 Мұңсыз адам 
 Надандық 
 Оқудағы балалардың үйішіне жазған хаты 
 Петр патшаның тергелгені 
 Полкан деген ит 
 Салақтық 
 Сараңдық пен жинақтылық 
 Сауысқан мен қарға 
 Сақып 
 Силинші деген ханым 
 Сәтемір хан 
 Таза бұлақ 
 Талаптың пайдасы 
 Тышқанның өсиеті 
 Түлкі мен ешкі 
 Тәкәпәршілік 
 Шеше мен бала 
 Қанағат 
 Қарға мен құрт 
 Қыпшақ Сейітұлы 
 Үнді 
 Үш ұры 
 Әділдік 
 Әдеп 
 Әке мен бала 
 Әлім кісі 
 Өрмекші, құмырсқа,қарлығаш 
 Өтіріктің залалы

See also
History of Kazakhstan

References

1841 births
1889 deaths
People from Kustanaysky Uyezd
Ethnic Kazakh people
Kazakhstani writers
Writers from the Russian Empire